Siderúrgica de Orinoco C.A. (Sidor) is the largest Venezuelan steel corporation. The company is situated in an industrial zone in Ciudad Guayana, Bolívar State, near the Orinoco River.

Major iron deposits were found in the area in 1926 and 1947. Mining companies constructed rail infrastructure to take iron ore to ports on the  Orinoco river. The Sidor plant was designed to make use of hydro-electricity from the Caroni, a tributary of the Orinoco, to process iron ore which had been hitherto exported.

SIDOR ceased operating permanently after the first 2019 Venezuelan blackout. Its production had been gradually decreasing since the company was nationalized in 2008 by Hugo Chávez. A former director said that Chávez had "received it as a productive and solvent company; but management coming from the military world, unaware of 'steel manufacturing' activity, together with the 'absence of strategic planning and investments, led to a sustained fall in production'."

History

Founded in 1953 as a public company, it was privatised in 1997 under President Rafael Caldera, with a 60% stake going to Argentina's Ternium.

It was renationalised in mid-2008 under Hugo Chávez following a series of industrial disputes over pay which had paralysed the company for over a year. In early 2009 compensation of around $1.65bn was nearly agreed for the nationalisation of Ternium's 59.7% stake, with Ternium also keeping a 10% stake in the company.

Production went down from 4.3 million tons in 2007 to 307 thousand tons in 2016, production capacity being 4.6 million tons. Thousands of workers were said to be staring at the ceiling instead of working as of March 2019.

In March 2020, the factory was reactivated to help dealing with health emergency caused by Covid-19 pandemic. It now produces industrial gases such as oxygen, nitrogen and argon.

In January 2021, during the second wave of COVID-19 and collapse of Manaus' health system, in Brazil, Jorge Arreaza, Venezuela's Foreign Minister, following instructions from Nicolás Maduro, offered part of his country's stock of oxygen to the government of Amazonas. About 100,000 liters were loaded at Siderúrgica del Orinoco (SIDOR) to proceed to Brazil.

See also
 Cerro Bolívar

References

External links 
 Sidor Webpage

Steel companies of Venezuela
Government-owned companies of Venezuela
Manufacturing companies established in 1953
1953 establishments in Venezuela
Techint
Buildings and structures in Ciudad Guayana